The Hôpital-Général de Québec is a Canadian medical facility located in the tiny municipality of Notre-Dame-des-Anges, Quebec (which consists solely of the hospital), surrounded by the La Cité-Limoilou borough of Quebec City.  It was classified as an historic site in 1977 by the Quebec government. Additionally, an archeological site listed on the Inventaire des sites archéologiques du Québec (Register of archeological sites of Quebec) is located there.

The central portion of the hospital cemetery, where over 1,000 French and British soldiers who died in the battles of the Plains of Abraham and Sainte-Foy are interred, is a National Historic Site of Canada. General Louis-Joseph de Montcalm is buried at the cemetery.

History
The hospital was founded in 1692 by Jean-Baptiste de Saint-Vallier, the second Bishop of Quebec. He had just acquired the Friary of Our Lady of the Angels (Notre-Dame-des-Anges) from the Recollect Friars Minor, who then relocated to the Place d'Armes within the town. The bishop had the friary building converted for use as a hospital, to care for the poor of the region.

The following year, Saint-Vallier requested that the Canonesses of St. Augustine of the Mercy of Jesus, who had founded the Hôtel-Dieu de Québec, send some of its members to Notre-Dame-des-Anges to help in the running of the hospital. In response, four canonesses arrived to take up this work. In 1698 the bishop entrusted the institution completely to the canonesses of the Hôtel-Dieu. The community of the canonesses operating the General Hospital formed an independent monastery in 1701.

Over time, the hospital began to specialize in the chronic care of the aged and poor.

Current status
The Hôpital-Général now serves as a long-term care home for elderly people suffering from cognitive deficits, under the name Centre d'hébergement Hôpital général de Québec. It is operated by the Centre de santé et de services sociaux de la Vieille-Capitale, the area's health and social services agency.

The building includes a museum, which houses many works of art from the 17th and 18th centuries done by local artists. Prominent among them is the work of a member of the community, Mother Marie-Madeleine de Saint-Louis Maufils, O.S.A. (1671-1702), who developed a unique style in painting scenes of the city, and who died from nursing victims of an outbreak of smallpox in the region. The remains of Bishop Saint-Valliers are entombed in the monastery chapel, built by the Recollect friars in 1671.

Historical publications
Répertoire des mariages de l'Hôpital général de Québec (Paroisse Notre-Dame-des-Anges) - 1693-1961, compiled by Benoit Pontbriand, Société Canadienne de Généalogie (Québec), 35 pages.

See also 

Notre-Dame-des-Anges, Quebec

References

External links 
Official website of the hospital

Hospitals in Quebec City
Hospitals established in the 17th century
Monasteries of Canonesses Regular
1692 establishments in the French colonial empire
French colonial architecture in Canada